The Secret Woman is a 1918 British silent drama film directed by A.E. Coleby and starring Maud Yates, Janet Alexander and Henry Victor.

Cast
 Maud Yates as Anne Redvers  
 Janet Alexander as Salome Westaway  
 Henry Victor as Jesse Redvers  
 A. E. Coleby as Anthony Redvers  
 Olive Noble as Barbara Westaway  
 Henry Nicholls-Bates as Michael Redvers  
 Humberston Wright as William Arscott  
 Olive Bell as Sarah Tapp  
 W. S. Manning as Flockmaster Westaway

References

Bibliography
 Palmer, Scott. British Film Actors' Credits, 1895-1987. McFarland, 1998.

External links
 

1918 films
1918 drama films
British drama films
British silent feature films
Films directed by A. E. Coleby
British black-and-white films
1910s English-language films
1910s British films
Silent drama films